Paul Hausser also known as Paul Falk after taking his maiden name post war (7 October 1880 – 21 December 1972) was a German general and then a high-ranking commander in the Waffen-SS who played a key role in the post-war efforts by former members of the Waffen-SS to achieve historical and legal rehabilitation.

Hausser served as an officer in the Prussian Army during World War I and attained the rank of general in the inter-war Reichsheer. After retirement, he joined the SS and was instrumental in forming the Waffen-SS. During World War II, he rose to the level of army group commander. He led Waffen-SS troops in the Third Battle of Kharkov, the Battle of Kursk and the Normandy Campaign. Hausser was the highest-ranking officer in the Waffen-SS alongside Sepp Dietrich. Unlike Dietrich, Hausser was a trained staff officer before joining the SS.

After the war he became a founding member and the first spokesperson of HIAG, a lobby group and a revisionist veterans' organisation, founded by former high-ranking Waffen-SS personnel in West Germany in 1951. It campaigned for the restoration of legal and economic rights of the Waffen-SS employing a multi-prong propaganda campaign to achieve its aims.

Hausser wrote two books, arguing the purely military role of the Waffen-SS and advancing the notion that its troops were "soldiers like any other", according to the title of the second book. Under Hausser's leadership, HIAG reshaped the image of the Waffen-SS as a so-called pan-European force that fought honorably and had no part in war crimes or Nazi atrocities. These ahistorical notions have since been discredited by historians.

Early life and military career
Hausser was born on 7 October 1880 in Brandenburg an der Havel into a Prussian military family and entered the army in 1892. In 1899, he graduated from a cadet academy and was commissioned as a lieutenant in the 155th (7th West Prussian) Infantry Regiment. Hausser graduated from the Prussian Military Academy in Berlin in 1911. Hausser married Elisabeth Gerard in 1912; the couple had one daughter who was born in December 1913. They remained married until his death in 1972.

During World War I he served in the German General Staff and in staff roles on the Eastern Front, primarily serving with the 109th Infantry Division between 1916 and 1918. He was promoted to major in 1918 and was retained in the postwar Reichswehr, reaching the rank of Oberst (colonel) by 1927.

Hausser retired from the Reichswehr in 1932 with the rank of Generalleutnant, having filled various appointments including chief of staff of Wehrkreis II (Military District 2) in Stettin, commander of the 10th Infantry Regiment, and deputy commander of the 4th Infantry Division. Hausser joined the right-wing World War I veterans' organization Der Stahlhelm, becoming the head of its Brandenburg-Berlin chapter in 1933. Soon after, the Stahlhelm was incorporated into the Sturmabteilung (SA), and, with the SA's demise, into the SS.

SS career
In November 1934 Hausser was transferred to the SS-Verfügungstruppe (SS Dispositional Troops; SS-VT) and assigned to the SS-Junkerschule Bad Tölz. He became the Inspector of the SS-VT in 1936. In this role, Hausser was in charge of the troop's military and ideological training but did not have command authority. The decision on deployment of the troops remained in Heinrich Himmler's hands. This aligned with Hitler's intentions to maintain these troops exclusively at his disposal, "neither [a part] of the army, nor of the police", according to Hitler's order of 17 August 1938.

Hausser served during the 1939 invasion of Poland as an observer with the mixed Wehrmacht/SS Panzer Division Kempf. In October 1939 the SS-VT was formed as a motorized infantry division known as the SS-Verfügungs-Division with Hausser in command. He led the division, later renamed 2nd SS Division Das Reich, through the French campaign of 1940 and in the early stages of Operation Barbarossa. For his service in the Soviet Union, Hausser was awarded the Knight's Cross of the Iron Cross in 1941 and the Oak Leaves in 1943 (he received the Swords for his service in Normandy). He was severely wounded, losing an eye.

After recovering, he commanded the newly formed SS-Panzer Corps (renamed II SS Panzer Corps in June 1943) and against Hitler's explicit orders withdrew his troops from Kharkov to avoid encirclement. He led the 1st, 2nd and 3rd SS divisions during the Battle of Kursk. After Kursk, his Corps was re-formed (substituting the 1st, 2nd and 3rd SS Panzer Divisions with the 9th and 10th SS divisions) and sent to Italy, then to France where he commanded them in the early stages of the Normandy Campaign.

After the death of Friedrich Dollmann, commander of the Seventh Army, Hausser was promoted to its command. During the Falaise encirclement in 1944, Hausser was seriously wounded (shot through the jaw). Hausser was promoted to SS-Oberst-Gruppenführer in August 1944 and subsequently commanded Army Group Oberrhein and later Army Group G until 3 April 1945. On the day he was relieved, Joseph Goebbels wrote, "He has definitely not stood the test." He ended the war on the staff of Field Marshal Albert Kesselring. At the Nuremberg Trials, he claimed that the Waffen-SS only had a military role and denied that it was involved in war crimes and atrocities.

Post-war activities

Work for U.S. Army Historical Division
Following the war, Hausser participated in the work of the U.S. Army Historical Division, where under the guidance of Franz Halder, German generals wrote World War II operational studies for the U.S. Army, first as POWs and then as employees. In the late 1940s, Hausser authored an operational study on the Seventh Army's response to the Allied Normandy breakout. The study, together with contributions from Rudolf Christoph von Gersdorff, Heinrich Freiherr von Lüttwitz, Wilhelm Fahrmbacher and Heinrich Eberbach, was published in 2004 as Fighting the Breakout: The German Army in Normandy from COBRA to the Falaise Gap.

Leader of Waffen-SS lobby group
From 1950, Hausser was active in HIAG, a revisionist organization and a lobby group of former Waffen-SS members. HIAG began in late 1950 as a loose association of local groups; by October 1951, however, it claimed to embrace 376 local branches across West Germany. In December 1951, Hausser became its first spokesperson.

With the publication of its first periodical in late 1951, HIAG was beginning to draw attention to itself and generate public controversy, including speculation that it was a neo-Nazi organization. In response, Hausser wrote an open letter to the Bundestag denying these accusations and describing the HIAG as an advocacy organisation for former Waffen-SS troops. Hausser asserted that its members rejected all forms of radicalism and were "upstanding citizens".

As part of its lobbying efforts, HIAG attempted to "manipulate historical record or simply to ignore it", according to the historian David C. Large, who studied HIAG in the 1980s. HIAG's rewriting of history included significant multi-prong propaganda efforts, including tendentious periodicals, books and public speeches, along with the publishing house of Munin Verlag, to serve as a platform for its publicity aims. The express aim of Munin Verlag was to publish the "war narratives" of former Waffen-SS members, in cooperation with HIAG.

Memoirs
Paul Hausser's 1953 book Waffen-SS im Einsatz ("Waffen-SS in Action") was the first major work by one of the HIAG leaders. A foreword from the former Wehrmacht General Heinz Guderian provided an endorsement for the Waffen-SS troops and referred to them as "the first realization of the European idea".

The book described the growth of Waffen-SS into a multinational force where foreign volunteers fought heroically as a "militant example of the great European idea". Historians have refuted this characterisation, arguing that it was largely Nazi propaganda employed to bolster the ranks of the Waffen-SS with foreign volunteers. The message was later repurposed by HIAG as it sought historical and legal rehabilitation of the force. Waffen-SS in Action was included in the index of objectionable war books maintained by West Germany's Federal Department for Media Harmful to Young Persons. The index was created in the early 1960s to limit the sale of such works to minors due to their chauvinism and glorification of violence.

Hausser later wrote another book, published in 1966 by HIAG's imprint , under the title Soldaten wie andere auch ("Soldiers Like Any Other"). According to the military historian S.P. MacKenzie, the work epitomised how HIAG leaders wanted the Waffen-SS to be remembered, while the historian Charles Sydnor described it as "equally tendentious".

Hausser's books, along with those by other key HIAG members and former Waffen-SS Generals Felix Steiner and Kurt Meyer, have been characterised by the historian Charles Sydnor as the "most important works of [Waffen-SS] apologist literature." These works demanded rehabilitation of the military branch of the Nazi Party and presented Waffen-SS members as both victims and misunderstood heroes.

Historical revisionism
By the mid-1950s, under Hausser's guidance, HIAG attempted to establish a position that separated the Waffen-SS from other SS formations and shifted responsibility for crimes that could not be denied to the Allgemeine-SS (security and police), the SS-Totenkopfverbände (concentration camp organisation, "Death's Head troops") and the Einsatzgruppen (mobile killing units). The Waffen-SS, according to this position, could thus be successfully integrated into the parallel myth of the clean Wehrmacht.

Hausser continued to deny that there was any connection between the Waffen-SS and Nazi atrocities. In 1957, he wrote an open letter in Der Freiwillige, HIAG's official publication, to West Germany's minister of defence, stating that Death's Head troops "merely served as external guards in the concentration camps without the possibility of interfering with the internal procedure". He did not mention that the guards accompanied prisoners on external labor details and that commanders of concentration camps generally came from the Waffen-SS. This apologist position also ignored the fact that the organizational structure of the SS tied the Waffen-SS to the Nazi annihilation machine through transfer of personnel between various SS units and the shifting responsibilities of the units themselves, as they may perform frontline duties at one time and then be reassigned to "pacification actions", the Nazi term for punitive operations in the rear.

The German historian Karsten Wilke, who wrote a book on HIAG, Die "Hilfsgemeinschaft auf Gegenseitigkeit" (HIAG) 1950–1990: Veteranen der Waffen-SS in der Bundesrepublik ("HIAG 1950–1990: Waffen-SS veterans in the Federal Republic"), notes that, by the 1970s, HIAG attained a monopoly on the historical representation of the Waffen-SS. Its recipe was simple and contained just four ingredients:
The Waffen-SS was apolitical
It was elite
It was innocent of all war crimes or Nazi atrocities
It was a European army par excellence, the Army of Europe.

Historians dismiss, and even ridicule, HIAG's characterisation. The French author Jean-Paul Picaper labels it as a "self-panegyric", while David Clay Large uses the words "extravagant fantasies about [Waffen-SS's] past and future". The historian James M. Diehl describes HIAG's claims of the Waffen-SS being the "fourth branch of the Wehrmacht" as "false", and HIAG's insistence that the force was a precursor to NATO as "even more outrageous".

Hausser's last project within HIAG was the five-hundred page SS picture tome under the nostalgic title Wenn alle Brüder schweigen ("When All Our Brothers Are Silent"); the project was spearheaded by Hausser, along with convicted Nazi war criminal Joachim Peiper, another prominent Waffen-SS figure, as a contributor. The publication was released in 1973.

Hausser died at the age of 92, on 21 December 1972 at Ludwigsburg.

Summary of his military and SS career

Dates of rank
 Leutnant: 20 March 1899
 Oberleutnant: 19 August 1909
 Hauptmann i.G.: 1 March 1914 (Patent from 1 October 1913)
 Major: 22 March 1918
 Oberstleutnant: 1 April 1923 (Patent from 15 November 1922)
 Oberst: 1 November 1927 (RDA from 1 July 1927)
 Generalmajor: 1 February 1931
 Charakter als Generalleutnant: 31 January 1932
 SA-Standartenführer SAR: 1 March 1934
 SS-Standartenführer: 15 November 1934 (RDA from 1 November 1934)
 SS-Oberführer: 1 July 1935
 SS-Brigadeführer: 22 May 1936
 SS-Gruppenführer: 1 June 1938
 Generalleutnant der Waffen-SS: 19 November 1940
 SS-Obergruppenführer und General der Waffen-SS: 1 October 1941
 SS-Oberst-Gruppenführer und Generaloberst der Waffen-SS: 1 August 1944

Decorations

 Iron Cross (1914) 2nd and 1st Class
 Bavarian Military Merit Order 4th Class with Swords
 Albert Order 1st Class with Swords
 Friedrich Order 1st Class with Swords
 Frederickscross
 House Order of Hohenzollern
 Austrian Order of the Iron Crown 3rd Class with war decoration (11 July 1918)
 Wound Badge in Silver (9 May 1942)
Clasp to the Iron Cross (2nd Class & 1st Class)
 Knight's Cross of the Iron Cross with Oak Leaves and Swords
 Knight's Cross on 8 August 1941 as commander of SS Division Das Reich
 Oak Leaves on 28 July 1943 as commanding general of the SS Panzer Corps
 Swords on 26 August 1944 as commander of the 7th Army

Works
Hausser authored two books:
Waffen-SS im Einsatz (Waffen SS in Action), : Göttingen (1953)
Soldaten wie andere auch (Soldiers Like Any Other), Munin Verlag: Osnabrück (1966)

Hausser's operational study on the 7th Army is included in the following volume:
Fighting the Breakout: The German Army in Normandy from COBRA to the Falaise Gap (contributor) (2004). Mechanicsburg, PA: Stackpole Books.

References

Citations

Bibliography

External links 
 

1880 births
1972 deaths
People from Brandenburg an der Havel
People from the Province of Brandenburg
German Army personnel of World War I
Prussian Army personnel
Recipients of the Knight's Cross of the Iron Cross with Oak Leaves and Swords
SS-Oberst-Gruppenführer
Burials at Munich Waldfriedhof
Lieutenant generals of the Reichswehr
Recipients of the clasp to the Iron Cross, 1st class
Waffen-SS personnel
20th-century Freikorps personnel
Historical negationism
Military personnel from Brandenburg
Members of HIAG